Egesina is a genus of longhorn beetles of the subfamily Lamiinae, containing the following species:

subgenus Callegesina
 Egesina anfracta (Gressitt, 1940)
 Egesina sarawakensis Breuning, 1943
 Egesina vitticollis Breuning, 1943

subgenus Callienispia
 Egesina anterufipennis Breuning, 1958
 Egesina cruciata Breuning, 1938
 Egesina elegans (Fisher, 1925)
 Egesina minuta (Fisher, 1925)
 Egesina monticola (Fisher, 1936)
 Egesina mystica Breuning, 1938
 Egesina pascoei Breuning, 1961

subgenus Cuphisia
 Egesina callosa (Pascoe, 1866)
 Egesina cleroides (Gahan, 1890)
 Egesina diffusa Holzschuh, 2007
 Egesina digitata Pesarini & Sabbadini, 1999
 Egesina guerryi (Pic, 1926)
 Egesina mjobergi Breuning, 1950
 Egesina salicivora Holzschuh, 2007
 Egesina subfasciata (Pic, 1926)
 Egesina tarsata Holzschuh, 2007

subgenus Egesina
 Egesina albolineata Breuning, 1942
 Egesina albomaculata (Fisher, 1925)
 Egesina anterufulipennis Breuning, 1961
 Egesina aspersa Holzschuh, 1998
 Egesina bakeri (Fisher, 1925)
 Egesina basirufa Breuning & Heyrovsky, 1961
 Egesina bhutanensis (Breuning, 1975)
 Egesina ceylonensis Breuning, 1960
 Egesina cylindrica Aurivillius, 1924
 Egesina davaoana Breuning, 1948
 Egesina fuchsi Breuning, 1970
 Egesina fusca (Fisher, 1925)
 Egesina generosa Holzschuh, 2003
 Egesina gracilicornis Breuning, 1940
 Egesina javana (Fisher, 1934)
 Egesina javanica Breuning, 1961
 Egesina lacertosa Holzschuh, 2007
 Egesina lanigera Holzschuh, 2007
 Egesina laosiana Breuning, 1982
 Egesina malaccensis Breuning, 1938
 Egesina mentaweiensis Breuning, 1943
 Egesina ornata (Fisher, 1925)
 Egesina picina Holzschuh, 2007
 Egesina postvittata Breuning, 1940
 Egesina rigida Pascoe, 1864
 Egesina setosa (Gressitt, 1937)
 Egesina siamensis Breuning, 1938
 Egesina umbrina Holzschuh, 2007
 Egesina varia (Fisher, 1925)

subgenus Niijimaia
 Egesina albomarmorata Breuning, 1938
 Egesina bifasciana Matsushita, 1933
 Egesina flavoapicalis Hayashi, 1971
 Egesina flavopicta Breuning & Heyrovsky, 1961
 Egesina formosana (Schwarzer, 1925)
 Egesina fujiwarai Toyoshima, 1999
 Egesina gilmouri Breuning, 1962
 Egesina grossepunctata Breuning, 1963
 Egesina indica Breuning, 1938
 Egesina modiglianii Breuning, 1943
 Egesina ochraceovittata Breuning, 1938
 Egesina picea Hayashi, 1962
 Egesina picta Breuning, 1940
 Egesina pseudocallosa Breuning, 1961
 Egesina sericans Breuning, 1939
 Egesina shibatai Hayashi, 1962
 Egesina sikkimensis Breuning, 1940
 Egesina tsushimae Breuning & Ohbayashi, 1964

References

 
Pteropliini